The 1957 Florida A&M Rattlers football team was an American football team that represented Florida A&M University as a member of the Southern Intercollegiate Athletic Conference (SIAC) during the 1957 NCAA College  Division football season. The team played its home games at Bragg Memorial Stadium in Tallahassee, Florida.

The team's statistical leaders included Lewis Johnson with 627 rushing yards, James Williams with 383 passing yards, and Alvis Chavis with 146 receiving yards.

Schedule

References

Florida AandM
Florida A&M Rattlers football seasons
Black college football national champions
College football undefeated seasons
Florida AandM Rattlers football